The 26th National Hockey League All-Star Game was held in the Madison Square Garden in New York City, home of the New York Rangers, on January 30, 1973. It was the first time that the All-Star Game was held in New York. The East Division All-Stars defeated the West Division All-Stars 5–4. Greg Polis was named the game's most valuable player.

League business
Clarence Campbell, president of the NHL announced that the NHL was expanding to Kansas City and Washington, D.C.

Uniforms 

Since the introduction of the divisional format of the game in 1969, the East Division All-Stars had worn white jerseys, while the West Division All-Stars had worn navy blue jerseys. The uniforms were redesigned for 1973, and beginning with this game and continuing through  the 1993 game, the home division or conference would wear the white jersey, while the visiting team would wear the dark jersey, which was orange until 1988.

Both the white and orange designs featured the same striping - a wide orange stripe with white stars bounded by two thin black stripes on both the sleeves and the waist. The NHL shield replaced the player number on the front of the jersey. The upper chest featured two large stars (orange on the white jersey, and vice versa), each containing a small NHL shield, and the shoulders also featured small NHL shields - elements carried over from the previous white East Division jersey. However, the shoulder striping from the previous design was removed. The numbers on the white jersey were orange with a black outline, while the orange jersey featured black numbers with a white outline. Both jerseys featured a black V-neck.

These uniforms continued to be used through the 33rd National Hockey League All-Star Game in 1981.

Team Lineups

Game summary 

Goaltenders : 
 East: Villemure (29:16 minutes), Giacomin (30:44 minutes).
 West: T. Esposito (29:16 minutes), Vachon (30:44 minutes).

Shots on goal : 
 East (34) 18 -  9 -  9
 West (30)  8 - 10 - 12

Referee : Lloyd Gilmour

Linesmen : Neil Armstrong, John D'Amico

Source: Podnieks

See also
1972–73 NHL season

References

 

All
National Hockey League All-Star Game
1970s in Manhattan
National Hockey League All-Star Game
Ice hockey competitions in New York City
Madison Square Garden
National Hockey League All-Star Games
Sports in Manhattan